Dorcadion vittigerum is a species of beetle in the family Cerambycidae. It was described by Panzer.

References

vittigerum